Charles Sherwood Stratton (January 4, 1838 – July 15, 1883), better known by his stage name "General Tom Thumb", was an American dwarf who achieved great fame as a performer under circus pioneer P. T. Barnum.

Childhood and early life

Born January 4, 1838, in Bridgeport, Connecticut, Stratton was the son of a carpenter named Sherwood Edward Stratton, who in turn was the son of Seth Sherwood Stratton and Amy Sharpe. Sherwood married his first cousin Cynthia Thompson, daughter of Joseph Thompson and Mary Ann Sharpe. Charles Stratton's maternal and paternal grandmothers, Amy and Mary Ann Sharpe, were stated to be small twin girls born on July 11, 1781 (or 1783) in Oxford, New Haven, Connecticut.

Born in Bridgeport to parents who were of medium height, Charles was a relatively large baby, weighing  at birth. Then he suddenly stopped growing. His parents became concerned when, after his first birthday, they noticed he had not grown at all in the previous six months. They showed him to their doctor, who said there was little chance Charles would ever reach normal height.

By late 1842 (at almost five years old), Stratton had grown only  from when he was six months old and had not gained any weight. Apart from this, he was a completely normal, healthy child, with several siblings who were of average size. His body was proportionate and functional.

Adoption by Barnum

Phineas T. Barnum heard about Stratton, and after contacting his parents, taught the boy how to sing, dance, mime, and impersonate famous people. Barnum also went into business with Stratton's father, who died in 1855. Stratton made his first tour of America at the age of five, with routines that included impersonating characters such as Cupid and Napoleon Bonaparte, as well as singing, dancing, and comical banter with another performer who acted as a straight man. To market the act, Barnum gave Stratton the name General Tom Thumb, naming him after the popular English fairy tale. The tour was a huge success and soon expanded.

A year later, Barnum took young Stratton on a tour of Europe, making him an international celebrity. Along with Barnum, Stratton appeared before Queen Victoria.  He also met the three-year-old future King Edward VII, at that time the Prince of Wales. In 1845, he triumphed at the Théâtre du Vaudeville (France) in the play Le petit Poucet of Dumanoir and Clairville. The tour was a huge success, with crowds mobbing him wherever he went. After his three-year tour in Europe, Stratton began his rise to stardom in the United States. Stratton's fame grew at an astonishing rate, and his popularity and celebrity surpassed that of any actor within his lifetime.

On his return home from his second tour in 1847, aboard the SS Cambria, he attracted the attention of the explorer John Palliser who "was not a little surprised, on entering the state-cabin, to hear the most unnatural shrill little pipe exclaiming, 'Waiter! bring me a Welsh rabbit'." During the voyage, General Tom Thumb contributed to a collection for the relief of famine victims in Ireland.

Stratton's first performances in New York marked a turning point in the history of freak show entertainment. Before Stratton's debut, the presentation of "human curiosities" for entertainment was deemed dishonorable and seen as an unpleasing carnival attraction. However, after viewers were introduced to Stratton and performances, he was able to change the perception people held toward freak shows. Stratton's lively and entertaining performances made these types of carnival shows one of the most favored forms of theatrical entertainment in the United States.

From the age of seven, Stratton performed in grand full-length fairytale melodramas under the management of P.T. Barnum. A few of the melodramas that Stratton performed were Hop o' My Thumb and the Seven League Boots. In these melodramas, Stratton was assigned the title role, which he played on multiple occasions. While Barnum sought to capitalize on Stratton's small stature, he also aimed to highlight and showcase his many true gifts as a performer. For example, Stratton was noted to be clever in his acts. In addition, he was a talented actor, singer, dancer, and comedian. As a result, certain dramatic critics did not compare his skills to those of the freak show community of which he was a member, but preferred to judge him on his merits as a professional entertainer.

Stratton became a Freemason on October 3, 1862.

Marriage and later life

His marriage in 1863, to Lavinia Warren, also a little person, became front-page news. The wedding took place at Grace Episcopal Church, and the wedding reception was held at New York City's Metropolitan Hotel. The couple stood atop a grand piano at the reception to greet some 10,000 guests. The best man at the wedding was George Washington Morrison ("Commodore") Nutt, another dwarf performer in Barnum's employ. The maid of honor was Minnie Warren, Lavinia's sister. Following the wedding, the couple was received by President Lincoln at the White House. Stratton and his wife toured together in Europe as well as British India, in particular the area that would later become Bangladesh.

Under Barnum's management, Stratton became a wealthy man. He owned a house in the fashionable part of New York and a steam yacht, and he had a wardrobe of fine clothes. He also owned a specially adapted home on one of Connecticut's Thimble Islands. When Barnum got into financial difficulty, Stratton bailed him out. Later, they became business partners. Stratton made his final appearance in England in 1878.

In January 1883, Stratton was staying at John F. Antisdel's Newhall House in Milwaukee when a fire broke out, which Milwaukee historian John Gurda would call "one of the worst hotel fires in American history". More than 71 people died, but Tom and Lavinia were saved by their manager, Sylvester Bleeker.

Death and legacy

Six months after surviving the Newhall House fire, Stratton died unexpectedly of a stroke. He was 45 years old. Over 20,000 people attended the funeral. P. T. Barnum purchased a life-sized statue of Tom Thumb and placed it as a gravestone at Mountain Grove Cemetery in Bridgeport, Connecticut. When she died, more than 35 years later, Lavinia Warren was interred next to him, with a simple gravestone that read "His Wife".

In 1959, vandals smashed the statue of Tom Thumb. It was restored by the Barnum Festival Society and Mountain Grove Cemetery Association with funds raised by public subscription.

The cause of Stratton's extreme shortness, then unknown, is referred to today as pituitary dwarfism. X-rays were not discovered until 1895, 12 years after Stratton's death, and the medical techniques of the day were unable to ascertain the pathology (if any) underlying his diminutive size at the time.

He was buried with Masonic honors by Saint John's Lodge. He became Master Mason in St. John's Lodge No. 3 at Bridgeport, Connecticut on October 8, 1862. He received the Commandery degrees (Masonic Knight Templar) in Hamilton Commandery No. 5 (Bridgeport, Connecticut), in 1863.

Screen portrayals
 George Brasno portrayed General Tom Thumb in the 1934 film The Mighty Barnum.
 Jimmy Clitheroe portrayed General Tom Thumb in the 1967 film Jules Verne's Rocket to the Moon.
 Paul Miller portrayed General Tom Thumb in the 1986 TV film Barnum!
 Sandor Raski portrayed General Tom Thumb in the 1986 TV film Barnum.
 Ed Gale portrayed General Tom Thumb in the 1995 TV film Tad. 
 Josh Ryan Evans portrayed General Tom Thumb in the 1999 TV film P.T. Barnum. 
 Sam Humphrey portrayed General Tom Thumb in the 2017 musical film The Greatest Showman.

See also

 Stamford Museum, where a suit of his clothes is displayed for comparison with those of Daniel Lambert.
 Tom Thumb House (Middleborough, Massachusetts), his summer house.
 Middleborough Historical Museum, which exhibits a large collection of Tom Thumb memorabilia.

References

Further reading
Lehman, Eric D. Becoming Tom Thumb: Charles Stratton, P.T. Barnum, and the Dawn of American Celebrity (Wesleyan University Press, distributed by University Press of New England; 2013) 276 pages; scholarly biography
American Sideshow: An Encyclopedia of History's Most Wondrous and Curiously Strange Performers (Tarcher/Penguin 2005), by Marc Hartzman.

External links

"Sideshow Ephemera Gallery: General Tom Thumb" by James G. Mundie – biographical essay with photos
Harper's portrait and report on General Tom Thumb's Wedding
Details of a museum in Middleboro, MA. A town where they made their home. – Link points to RoadsideAmerica.com
"Tom Thumb" at the Disability History Museum
The South Dakota Music Museum where a violin given to him, purported by P.T. Barnum to be a Stradivarius, rests in the Everist Gallery.

American circus performers
People from Bridgeport, Connecticut
Tom Thumb
Entertainers with dwarfism
Sideshow performers
Burials at Mountain Grove Cemetery, Bridgeport
1838 births
1883 deaths